The 1975 Skate Canada International was held in Edmonton, Alberta on October 23–25. Medals were awarded in the disciplines of men's singles, ladies' singles, and ice dancing.

Results

Men

Ladies

Ice dancing

References

Skate Canada International, 1975
Skate Canada International
1975 in Canadian sports 
1975 in Alberta